Luke Tait (born 26 October 1981 in Barrie, Ontario) is a Canadian rugby union player. He plays as a lock.

Tait last played for James Bay of the British Columbia Premiership. He has played previously for Cardiff RFC, Ospreys, Overmach Parma, and Stade Montois.

He was a part of the Canadian national team since his debut on 25 May 2005, in a 30–26 win over United States. He played three matches in the 2007 Rugby World Cup in France.

Tait earned 23 caps and scored his first points for Canada when he ran in a try versus Uruguay at the 2010 Churchill Cup.

References

External links
Luke Tait International Statistics

1981 births
Canada international rugby union players
Canadian rugby union players
Living people
Rugby union locks
Sportspeople from Barrie
Cardiff Rugby players
Ospreys (rugby union) players
Stade Montois players